Just Say Hi is a short 2013 British romantic comedy film about a blossoming romance between a boy and a girl who meet every morning at a bus stop.

Main cast 
Tyler Collins as the Boy
Natalie Wallace as the Girl
John McPhail as Norbert
John Young as Wonder Woman

Release and reception 
Just Say Hi was released on 1 July 2013 and was positively received by critics. Amber Wilkinson of Eye for Film wrote:  Robbie Collins of the Daily Telegraph described the film as: 

The film's first festival encounter was the Virgin Media Short competition run by Virgin Media. The film made it through to the final where it competed with 12 other short films which were judged by a panel which included actor David Tennant, Shane Meadows and film critic James King. The film was a hit with the judges and the audience at home winning 2 out of the 3 awards available making McPhail the only director in the competition's history to win multiple awards. The production team were presented with the awards at a ceremony in London which included £5,000 in film funding with mentoring from the British Film Institute and a voucher for £5,000 to spend on Nikon Equipment.

In 2014, the film was featured in the Très Court International Film Festival in which it was screened in over 100 cities in 23 countries.

The film went on to appear in many domestic and international festivals including the Bradford International Film Festival, the Shärt International Comedy Film Festival and the Aberfeldy Film Festival where it picked up the Palme-Dewar Audience Choice Award.

Awards

References

External links 
 
 Worry Drake Productions Website
 Just Say Hi on Virgin Media Site
 John McPhail Interview at the Virgin Media Short Awards

Films set in Scotland
Films shot in Scotland
Scottish films
2013 films
English-language Scottish films
British independent films
2013 romantic comedy films
British romantic comedy films
2013 independent films
2010s English-language films
Films directed by John McPhail
2010s British films